Connor Reece Escoto Tacagni (born September 27, 1993) is a professional footballer who currently plays as a Striker or winger for Philippines Football League club Kaya F.C.-Iloilo. Born in England, he has represented the Philippines U23 national team.

Club career

San Beda College
Tacagni began his Filipino amateur football career from 2015 - 2017 at San Beda University on a sports scholarship joining the football team as a striker, The San Beda Red Booters under Coach Aris Caslib also the U23 Philippine National Team coach at the time.

FC Meralco Manila
Tacagni began his professional career in the Philippines Football League following a transfer to FC Meralco Manila from 2017 until the team was disestablished in 2018.

Kaya F.C. - Iloilo
Since 2018, Tacagni has played for Kaya F.C.–Iloilo as a member of the squad who won the Copa Paulino Alcantara in 2018. Qualifying for the AFC Cup, Tacagni played in the group stages.

International career
Tacagni was born in Shrewsbury, England to an English father and a Filipino mother which made him eligible to play for the England and Philippines.

Tacagni made his international debut for the Philippines National Under-23 football team at the Southeast Asian Games 2015 hosted in Singapore.

References

Connor Tacagni - Player Profile - Football

Kaya thumps Mendiola; Air Force scores

AFC Cup 2019: Kaya FC-Iloilo strike at the death to deny PSM Makassar

External links
Profile at Kaya F.C

1993 births
Living people
Sportspeople from Shrewsbury
Citizens of the Philippines through descent
Filipino footballers
English footballers
English people of Filipino descent
Filipino people of English descent
Filipino British sportspeople
British Asian footballers
Association football forwards
Kaya F.C. players
F.C. Meralco Manila players